The Lanchester Light Six was a small luxury car in the twelve tax horsepower class manufactured for The Lanchester Motor Company Limited by BSA subsidiary The Daimler Company Limited. Announced in September 1934 it was the better-finished  version of an almost identical pair the other half being the BSA Light Six

It followed the Lanchester 15/18 introduced three years earlier and Ten introduced in October 1932 as the third break away from previous Lanchester large cars.

This model was to become the Fourteen or Roadrider in 1937

Engine

Chassis
The larger twelve horsepower six-cylinder engine was mounted in the chassis of the ten horsepower four-cylinder Lanchester Ten. Steering was by cam and lever, brakes were mechanical. Tyres specified were 5 inch on 18 inch wheels.

The most popular bodywork styles were the saloons. These were available as both 'six light' and 'four light' versions, the term 'light' here referring to the side windows. The six-light had a longer roofline with a third side window behind the rear door, the four-light sports saloon had a fixed head canvas body above the waistline.

Prices
six-light saloon and fixed head coupé £365
sports saloon and streamlined saloon £375
drophead coupé £390
Romney coupé by Martin Walter £430 (made to order)
Tickford coupé by Salmons & Sons £435 (made to order)

References

Light Six
Cars introduced in 1934
Sedans
Rear-wheel-drive vehicles